First Citizens Bancshares, Inc. is a bank holding company based in Raleigh, North Carolina. Its primary subsidiary is First Citizens Bank. It is on the list of largest banks in the United States.

As of December 31, 2019, the company operated 574 branches in 19 states; however, 72% of the bank's deposits were in North Carolina and South Carolina.

For three generations, the bank has been led by the family of Robert Powell Holding, who joined the bank in 1918 and rose to president in 1935.

History
The bank opened on March 1, 1898 as Bank of Smithfield. It evolved into First National Bank of Smithfield, and merged with Citizens National Bank to become First and Citizens National Bank. In 1929, it changed its name to First Citizens Bank and Trust Company. In 1986, it reorganized as a holding company, First Citizens BancShares, Inc.

Acquisitions

References

External links

 

American companies established in 1898
Banks based in North Carolina
Banks established in 1898
Companies based in Raleigh, North Carolina
Companies listed on the Nasdaq
Economy of the Southeastern United States